Mifune ("Mifune's Last Song") is a 1999 romantic comedy film, it is the third film to be made according to the Dogme 95 group rules. It was directed by Søren Kragh-Jacobsen. The film was a great success in Denmark and an international blockbuster, ranked among the ten best-selling Danish films worldwide.
It was produced by Nimbus Film.

At the 49th Berlin International Film Festival, the film won the Silver Bear – Special Jury Prize and Iben Hjejle won an Honourable Mention.

Plot 
Kresten had moved from his parents' farm on Lolland, an out-of-the-way small Danish island, to Copenhagen to pursue his working career. When his father dies, he has to move back to the farm, where nothing much has happened since he left. He places an ad in the local newspaper to get help running the farm and taking care of his brother. The prostitute Liva, who is running away from harassing telephone calls, takes the job. But running away from one's past isn't easy.

Cast 
 Iben Hjejle as Liva
 Anders W. Berthelsen as Kresten
 Jesper Asholt
 Emil Tarding
 Anders Hove
 Sofie Gråbøl
 Paprika Steen
 
 Ellen Hillingsø
 Sidse Babett Knudsen
 
 Søren Malling
 
 
 
 Klaus Bondam
 Sofie Stougaard

Title 
The title of the film is a reference to recently deceased Toshiro Mifune (1920–1997), prolific Japanese film actor whose roles included that of Kikuchiyo, one of Akira Kurosawa's Seven Samurai. Mifune's look and demeanor is imitated by Kirsten in a terrifying and/or delighting entertainment for his brother Rud. It also refers to Bjørnstjerne Bjørnson's poem Sidste Sang (1870).

Confession 
The "confession" is an idea adapted by Thomas Vinterberg in the first Dogme 95 film: Make a confession if elements of the film do not comply with the strict interpretation of the Dogme-rules. It is written from the director's point of view.

As one of the DOGME 95 brethren and co-signatory of the Vow of Chastity I feel moved to confess to the following transgressions of the aforesaid Vow during the production of Dogme 3 – Mifune. Please note that the film has been approved as a Dogme work, as only one genuine breach of the rules has actually taken place. The rest may be regarded as moral breaches.
 I confess to having made one take with a black drape covering a window. This is not only the addition of a property, but must also be regarded as a kind of lighting arrangement.
 I confess to moving furniture and fittings around the house.
 I confess to having taken with me a number of albums of my favourite comic book series as a youth, Linda & Valentin (Valérian and Laureline).
 I confess to helping to chase the neighbour's free-range hens across our location and including them in the film.
 I confess that I brought a photographic image from an old lady from the area and hung it in a prominent position in one scene: not as part of the plot, but more as a selfish, spontaneous, pleasureable whim.
 I confess to borrowing a hydraulic platform from a painter, which we used for the only two bird's-eye overview shots in the film.
 I do solemnly declare that in my presence the remainder of Dogme 3 – Mifune was produced in accordance with the vow of chastity.
 I also point out that the film has been approved by DOGME 95 as a Dogme film, as in real terms no more than a single breach of the rules has been committed. The rest may be regarded as moral transgressions.

See also 
 List of submissions to the 72nd Academy Awards for Best Foreign Language Film
 List of Danish submissions for the Academy Award for Best Foreign Language Film

References

External links 
 
 
 

1999 films
Danish romantic comedy films
1990s Danish-language films
Dogme 95 films
Films directed by Søren Kragh-Jacobsen
Films with screenplays by Anders Thomas Jensen
Nimbus Film films
Silver Bear Grand Jury Prize winners
Sony Pictures Classics films